Manuel Y. Ferrer was regarded during his lifetime as one of the United States' finest virtuoso guitarists. He was born in San Antonio, Baja California Sur (Mexico) to Catalan parents from Spain. As a young man he left his native town, travelling by stage coach to Santa Barbara, in Alta California.  He met a priest at mission Santa Barbara, a skilled guitarist, who gave him advanced instructions. Ferrer trained diligently, with the heightened enthusiasm that would gradually establish his reputation in the musical world. In 1850 he moved to San Francisco, where his public debut took place at a guitar concert in the Metropolitan Theatre on September 18, 1854. On November 22 of the following year, he performed with pianist Gustave A. Scott and harpist William McKorkell at the Music Hall.

Ferrer taught guitar and performed in San Francisco for fifty years. His wife Jesusita de Vivar was also a musician, as were three of his ten children: Adele (guitar), Carmelita (mandolin), and Ricardo (violin). The family toured in the east in 1891, where they performed at the White House and the Vanderbilt mansion in New York. His public appearances as a guitar soloist, and also as a member of a guitar quartet, were very frequent in the San Francisco Bay Area.

For several years he was conductor of the mandolin band, El Mandolinita. The music performed by this orchestra was solely Ferrer’s compositions and arrangements. He published numerous pieces for guitar solo, but many of his works remained in manuscript. 
He taught the guitar up to the time of his death, which occurred very suddenly on June 1, 1904. He had gone from his home in Oakland to San Francisco to teach, and gave several lessons, when he was suddenly taken ill, and went to the home of his daughter. Later he was removed to hospital, where he died the same day, his third wife surviving him for several years. Philp J. Bone made a mistake with claiming he had 3 wives. Vahdah Olcott-Bickford (who was his student and lived with them during the last years of his life) confirmed that Jesusita Zuniga De Vivar, called Jessie, was his only wife. The census record of 1900 shows they were married for many years. Also, their daughter, Jovita Ferrer who married Chesley Knight Bonestell Sr., was a talented soprano who died early. Jovita and Chesley were the parents of Chesley Knight Bonestell Jr., famed space artist.

External links
 More on Ferrer
 Alexandrina (1873), dedicated to Ferrer's fellow members of the Bohemian Club

Sources
Philip J.Bone: The Guitar & Mandoline: Biographies of Celebrated Players and Composers, London:Schott & Co.LTD. First edition 1914, second enlarged 1954, reprint of second edition with new preface, 1972.
Mary Kay Duggan: The California Sheet Music Project, Berkeley, California. http://www.sims.berkeley.edu/~mkduggan/music.html

1904 deaths
American people of Catalan descent
Hispanic and Latino American musicians
Mexican emigrants to the United States
People from La Paz Municipality, Baja California Sur
American musicians of Mexican descent
Guitarists from San Francisco
19th-century American guitarists
Musicians from California
Music of California
Music of the San Francisco Bay Area
Musicians from the San Francisco Bay Area
1832 births